The 1987–88 Indiana Hoosiers men's basketball team represented Indiana University. Their head coach was Bobby Knight, who was in his 17th year. The team played its home games in Assembly Hall in Bloomington, Indiana, and was a member of the Big Ten Conference.

The Hoosiers finished the regular season with an overall record of 19–10 and a conference record of 11–7, finishing 5th in the Big Ten Conference. The Hoosiers were invited to participate in the 1988 NCAA Tournament as a 4-seed; however, IU made a quick exit with a first-round loss to 13-seed Richmond.

Roster

Schedule/Results

|-
!colspan=9 style=|Non-Conference Regular Season

|-
!colspan=9 style=|Big Ten Regular Season

|-
!colspan=9 style=|NCAA Tournament

Rankings

References

Indiana Hoosiers men's basketball seasons
Indiana
Indiana
1987 in sports in Indiana
1988 in sports in Indiana